Golden 1 Credit Union (or Golden 1) is a credit union headquartered in Sacramento, California. Golden 1 currently serves its members throughout California with more than 70 branches and over 30,000 CO-OP ATMs nationwide.

Founded in 1933 as California State Employees Credit Union #1, it changed its name to Golden 1 in 1977.

As of June 2018, Golden 1 had in excess of $12 billion USD in assets and more than one million members, becoming the first state-chartered credit union to be granted statewide field of membership in California. This makes it one of the nation's largest credit unions and the second largest credit union in the State of California. The current President & CEO is Donna A. Bland.

On June 16, 2015, Golden 1 acquired naming rights for a new arena in the heart of downtown Sacramento to replace the Sacramento Kings' Sleep Train Arena. This investment cost $120 million over 20 years, with an average annual value at $6 million. It is one of the largest naming rights deals for a single-tenant NBA arena and the first time a credit union has put its name on a major sports facility.

References

External links
 Official website

Credit unions based in California
Companies based in Sacramento, California
Mutual companies of the United States
Banks established in 1933
1933 establishments in California
American companies established in 1933